In mathematics, a fundamental matrix of a system of n homogeneous linear ordinary differential equations

is a matrix-valued function  whose columns are linearly independent solutions of the system.

Control theory
The fundamental matrix is used to express the state-transition matrix, an essential component in the solution of a system of linear ordinary differential equations.

See also
Linear differential equation
Liouville's formula
Systems of ordinary differential equations

References

Matrices
Differential calculus